Plessi is a settlement in Võru Parish, Võru County in southeastern Estonia.

References 

Võru Parish
Villages in Võru County